The following is a list of United States Army and United States Marine Corps divisions of World War II.
The United States began the war with only a handful of active divisions:  five infantry and one cavalry.  By the end of the war, the nation had fielded nearly one hundred. The number of divisions fielded by the United States Army in relation to the population and industrial capacity of the country, in comparison to the number of divisions fielded by various other Allied and Axis countries, has been called "the 90-Division Gamble". Additionally, due to the US Army's method of employment combined with events of the war, the United States did not suffer the destruction of any of its division-size units during the conflict, except for the Philippine Division in 1942. 

Several divisions were "constituted" (placed on the rolls of the Army and contemplated for organization) but never actually activated, and "phantom" units were also "raised" on paper during the war to confuse the Germans.

United States Army Divisions

The 82nd Airborne Division was originally the 82nd Infantry Division of the Organized Reserve, and after being ordered into active military service on 25 March 1942, was converted to an airborne division on 15 August 1942; the 101st Infantry Division was disbanded in the Organized Reserve on 15 August 1942, and was concurrently reconstituted and activated in the Army of the United States as an airborne division on the same date.

The 15th Airborne Division was constituted, but never activated. It was dropped from the mobilization program in 1943.

Airborne Divisions

Armored Divisions

The 19th Armored Division was constituted, but never activated. It was dropped from the mobilization program in 1943.

Cavalry Divisions

Infantry Divisions

1st to 25th 

The 1st through 25th Infantry Divisions, excepting the 10th Mountain Division, were raised in the Regular Army or the Army of the United States prior to American involvement in World War II. Because of funding cuts, in September 1921, the 4th through 9th Infantry Divisions were mostly inactivated. Within a few years, the headquarters of the 1st and 3rd Infantry Divisions "almost ceased to exist. Only the division commander and a few staff officers remained to carry out minimal division administrative functions, and neither division exercised true command func­tions over their units." The 2nd Infantry Division remained the most functional stateside division, as it was concentrated entirely at Fort Sam Houston, Texas. By the mid-1920s, most of the divisions' inactive units were staffed with Organized Reserve officers as Regular Army Inactive units.

The Hawaiian Division, "which was the closest thing to a full-strength division in the interwar American Army." was split on 1 October 1941 to create the 24th and 25th Infantry Divisions. The 24th Infantry Division headquarters inherited the lineage of the Hawaiian Division's headquarters, while the 25th Infantry Division was raised in the Army of the United States. 

The 10th Mountain Division was raised in the Army of the United States in 1943.

26th to 45th 

The 26th through 45th Divisions, with the exception of the 39th and 42nd Divisions, were raised in the National Guard during and after World War I. In postwar mobilization plans, the 26th through 45th Divisions, less two, were allotted to the National Guard. The 30th, 31st, and 39th Divisions had been organized in what would become the states of the Fourth Corps Area; the designations of the 30th and 39th Divisions were originally selected, with the 31st Division being deleted. In 1923, the adjutants general of the states concerned successfully requested that the War Department change the designation of the 39th Division to the 31st Division and adjust allotments of units accordingly. The 42nd Division was the second division deleted from the mobilization program as it had contained units from twenty-six states and the District of Columbia, although it would be reconstituted during the war as a division in the Army of the United States.

63rd to 89th 

After World War I, 33 infantry divisions (the 76th through 104th) were organized as part of the Organized Reserve. They were nominally regional organizations, drawing their officer cadre and a small, nearly insignificant, number of enlisted men from an allotted portion of a state, entire state, or multiple states, similar to National Guard units. Prior to American involvement in World War II, Organized Reserve officers were called to active duty individually and assigned to existing Regular Army and National Guard units. When the Organized Reserve units themselves were called to active duty beginning in 1942, "few of the Reserve officers originally assigned to...units were available for duty with them. Consequently, the units as activated bore small resemblance to those of peacetime." 

The 61st, 62nd, 67th, 68th, and 72nd-74th Infantry Divisions were constituted, but never activated. They were dropped from the mobilization program in 1943.

90th to 106th 

The 105th and 107th Infantry Divisions were constituted, but never activated. They were intended as additional segregated African American divisions. They were dropped from the mobilization program in 1943.

United States Marine Corps Divisions

See also 
Allies:
 List of Australian divisions in World War II
 List of British divisions in World War II
 List of Canadian divisions in World War II
 List of French divisions in World War II
 List of Indian divisions in World War II
 List of Polish divisions in World War II
 List of Soviet divisions 1917–45

Axis:
 List of Finnish divisions in the Continuation War
 List of German military units of World War II
 List of Italian divisions in World War II
 List of Japanese Infantry divisions

References

External links
 The Combat Chronicles of United States Army Divisions in World War II compiled by the United States Army Center of Military History